WBFJ may refer to:

 WBFJ (AM), a radio station (1550 AM) licensed to serve Winston-Salem, North Carolina, United States
 WBFJ-FM, a radio station (89.3 FM) licensed to serve Winston-Salem